Martin Lintzel (1901–1955) was a German historian, specialising on medieval German history.
He studied at the University of Halle during 1919–1925, under Albert Werminghoff.
His dissertation on the medieval institution of the Hoftage was published in 1924, supervised by Robert Holtzmann. He was a lecturer at Halle from 1931.
In March 1935, he was elected as professor for medieval and modern history at the University of Kiel, but was sent back to Halle in 1936, following a political dispute with the National Socialist press and student organisations in Kiel.  He entered military service for two months during 1944, but was discharged due to suffering from depression.
He continued to lecture at Halle until 1953, when he once again began to suffer from severe depression following the suicide of a friend and the death of his wife. He committed suicide two years later.

Lintzel was a member of the Saxon Academy of Sciences, the German Academy of Sciences at Berlin 
and the Göttingen Academy of Sciences and Humanities.

Bibliography 
1924. Die Beschlüsse der deutschen Hoftage von 911 bis 1056 
1933. Die Stände der deutschen Volksrechte, hauptsächlich der Lex Saxonum
1933. Studien über Liudprand von Cremona 
1933. Der sächsische Stammesstaat und seine Eroberung durch die Franken 
1935. Karl der Große und Widukind
1937. Die Germanen auf deutschem Boden. Von der Völkerwanderung bis zum ersten Reich
1943. Die Kaiserpolitik Ottos des Grossen 
1952. Die Entstehung des Kurfürstenkollegs 
1953. Miszellen zur Geschichte des zehnten Jahrhunderts

References

Peter Segl: Mittelalterforschung in der Geschichtswissenschaft der DDR. In: A. Fischer, G. Heydemann (eds.): Geschichtswissenschaft in der DDR. vol. 2: Vor- und Frühgeschichte bis Neueste Geschichte. Berlin 1990, 99–148, (p. 101). 
 Herbert Helbig, "Martin Lintzel. In memoriam" (obituary), Zeitschrift der Savigny-Stiftung für Rechtsgeschichte. Germanistische Abtheilung  73 (1956),  562–569.
 Karl Jordan: "Nekrolog Martin Lintzel" (obituary),  Historische Zeitschrift 181 (1956), 240f.
 Leo Stern, "Martin Lintzel (1901–1955)" (obituary), Zeitschrift für Geschichtswissenschaft 3.5  (1955), 817–819.
 Walter Zöllner, Karl oder Widukind? Martin Lintzel und die NS-„Geschichtsdeutung“ in den Anfangsjahren der faschistischen Diktatur  (1975). 
 Walter Zöllner: "Martin Lintzel" in: Heinz Heitzer et al. (eds.), Wegbereiter der DDR- Geschichtswissenschaft. Biographien. (1989), 136–148.

20th-century German historians
German medievalists
Members of the German Academy of Sciences at Berlin
1901 births
1955 deaths
1955 suicides
Suicides in Germany